Tex is a 1982 American coming-of-age drama film directed by Tim Hunter in his directorial debut, from a screenplay by Charles S. Haas and Hunter, based on S. E. Hinton's best-selling 1979 novel of the same name. It follows two teenage brothers in rural Oklahoma and their struggle to grow up after their mother's death and their father's departure. The film stars Matt Dillon in the title role, with Jim Metzler, Meg Tilly, Bill McKinney, and Ben Johnson in supporting roles. Metzler was nominated for a Golden Globe Award for his performance.

Tex is seen as one of the earliest efforts for Disney to put mature content in its movies and received positive reviews for its realism and its content.

Premise 
A coming-of-age adventure about two brothers, Tex and Mason McCormick, struggling to make it on their own when their mother dies and their father leaves them in their Oklahoma home.
Fifteen-year-old Tex McCormick and his 17-year-old brother Mason are trying to make it on their own in the absence of their rodeo-riding father. Mason takes over running the household and, to make ends meet, sells Tex’s beloved horse, Rowdy. Tex gets mad at Mason and heedlessly tumbles into scrape after scrape. When his Pop comes home, Tex is shocked to learn that he isn’t his real father. But Tex realizes that Mason and Pop do love him, and it is time to start growing up.

Cast 
 Matt Dillon as Texas "Tex" McCormick
 Jim Metzler as Mason "Mace" McCormick
 Meg Tilly as Jamie Collins
 Bill McKinney as Pop McCormick
 Frances Lee McCain as Mrs. Johnson
 Ben Johnson as Cole Collins
 Phil Brock as Lem Peters
 Emilio Estevez as Johnny Collins
 Tom Virtue as Robert “Bob” Collins
 Jack Thibeau as Coach Jackson
 Željko Ivanek as Hitchhiker Mark Jennings
 Pamela Ludwig as Connie Peters
 S.E. Hinton as Mrs. Barnes

Production 
The film was rated "PG" rather than the "G" then customarily earned by Walt Disney Studios productions, and was  noted as an early effort by Disney to incorporate more mature subject matter into its films.  The film was somewhat edgy for Disney at the time for its scenes that depicted marijuana use as well as featuring a moderate amount of profanity. Tim Hunter, who had previously co-written the 1979 film Over the Edge with Charles Haas, brought the project to Disney and asked for the opportunity to direct it himself.  The film was shot entirely on location in and around Tulsa, Oklahoma and its suburbs,  the setting of the S. E. Hinton novel on which it is based.

Reception

Critical response 
On review aggregator Rotten Tomatoes, Tex holds an approval rating of 85% based on 13 reviews, with an average rating of 6.8/10. Janet Maslin of The New York Times lauded the picture as "an utterly disarming, believable portrait of a small-town adolescent" that "captures Miss Hinton's novel perfectly" and that would "make a star out of Matt Dillon" and "forever alter the way moviegoers think about Walt Disney pictures." Roger Ebert gave the film 4 stars out of 4 and noted that Hunter and Haas, as in their previous writing effort, the 1979 film Over the Edge, were "still remembering what it's like to be young, still getting the dialogue and the attitudes, the hang-ups and the dreams, exactly right." David Sterritt of The Christian Science Monitor called it "probably the best picture turned out by the Disney studio since the heyday of the legendary Walt himself." On the other hand, Variety wrote that "writers Charlie Haas and Tim Hunter (latter making his directing debut) seem intent on incorporating every conceivable adolescent and adult trauma into their script [from the novel by S.E. Hinton], thus leaving the film with a very overdone, contrived feeling."

Accolades

Home video release 
Tex was released on VHS in 1983 by Walt Disney Home Video. The film was released on DVD by Walt Disney Home Entertainment on September 7, 2004.

References

External links 

 
 
 

1982 films
1982 drama films
1982 directorial debut films
1980s American films
1980s English-language films
1980s coming-of-age drama films
1980s high school films
American coming-of-age drama films
American high school films
Films about brothers
Films about father–son relationships
Films about friendship
Films about teenagers
Films based on American novels
Films directed by Tim Hunter
Films produced by Tim Zinnemann
Films scored by Pino Donaggio
Films set in Tulsa, Oklahoma
Films shot in Oklahoma
Walt Disney Pictures films